The following are the national records in athletics in Somalia maintained by the Somali Athletics Federation (SAF).

Outdoor

Key to tables:

h = hand timing

OT = oversized track (> 200m in circumference)

Men

Women

Indoor

Men

Women

References
General
World Athletics Statistic Handbook 2019: National Outdoor Records
World Athletics Statistic Handbook 2018: National Indoor Records
Specific

External links
Somalia National Olympic Committee (Nocsom) web site

Somalia
Records
Athletics